Francis Dhomont (born 2 November 1926) is a French composer of electroacoustic / acousmatic music.

Biography
Born in Paris, Dhomont studied composition under Ginette Waldmeier, Charles Koechlin and Nadia Boulanger.

In 1963 he decided to dedicate his time to electroacoustic composition utilising natural sounds. Performances in public of his music are done using the French "diffusion" technique over multiple loudspeakers. His work consists exclusively of tape pieces using natural, or "found" sounds, exploring morphological interplay and the ambiguities between sound and the images it may create.

Dhomont's work has won many international awards including at the Bourges International Electroacoustic Music Competition (France), the Magisterium Prize in 1988, Prix Ars Electronica in 1992 (Linz, Austria) and others. In 1997, as the winner of the Canada Council for the Arts' Lynch-Staunton Prize, he was supported by the DAAD Artists-in-Berlin Program for a residence in Berlin. He was recently awarded a prestigious career grant by the Conseil des arts et des lettres du Québec. Dhomont is the editor of several electroacoustic music journals, and has produced many radio programs for Radio-Canada and Radio France.

From 1978 to 2005, he divided his time between France and Québec, where he taught at the Université de Montréal from 1980 to 1996. He was a founding member of the Canadian Electroacoustic Community. He now lives in Avignon, France, and regularly presents his works in France and abroad. He frequently participates in juries.

Recordings

 ... et autres utopies (empreintes DIGITALes, IMED 0682, 2006)
 Jalons (empreintes DIGITALes, IMED 0365, 2003)
 Cycle du son (empreintes DIGITALes, IMED 0158, 2001)
 Frankenstein Symphony (Asphodel, ASP 0978, 1997)
 Forêt profonde (empreintes DIGITALes, IMED 9634, 1996)
 Sous le regard d'un soleil noir (empreintes DIGITALes, IMED 9633, 1996)
 Les dérives du signe (empreintes DIGITALes, IMED 9608, 1996)
 Cycle de l'errance (empreintes DIGITALes, IMED 9607, 1996)
 Mouvances~Métaphores (empreintes DIGITALes, IMED 9107/08, 1991)

List of works

 À cordes perdues (1977), doublebass, and tape
 L'air du large (1997–98)
 À propos de K (2006)
 Asie (1975), audiovisual presentation (images by Giovanni Biaggini)
 Assemblages (1972)
 AvatArsSon (1998)
 Brief an den Vater (2005)
 Cathédrale d'images (1977), large-scale audiovisual presentation
 Chiaroscuro (1987)
 Chroniques de la lumière (1989, 2005)
 Cité du dedans (1972)
 Convulsive! (1995)
 Corps et âme (2001–02)
 CPH Pendler Music (1997)
 Drôles d'oiseaux (1985–86, 2001)
 L'électro (1990)
 En cuerdas (1998)
 Espace / Escape (1989)
 Espaces sonores pour des textes de Jean Tortel (1976), radiophonic piece
 Figures de la nuit / Faces of the Night (1991–92)
 Forêt profonde (1994–96)
 Frankenstein Symphony (1997)
 Glank-50 (2002)
 Here and There (2003)
 Je te salue, vieil océan! (1998, 2000–04)
 Lettre de Sarajevo (1995–96)
 La liberté ou la mort (1976), incidental music
 Mais laisserons-nous mourir Arianna? (1979)
 Métonymie ou le corps impossible (1976)
 Moirures (2006), videomusic
 Les moirures du temps (1999–2000)
 ... mourir un peu (1984–87)
 Nocturne à Combray (1995–96)
 Novars (1989)
 Objets retrouvés (1996)
 Phonurgie (1998)
 Poe-Debussy, Autour de la maison Usher (1988), incidental music for a musical theater by Marthe Forget
 Points de fuite (1982)
 Premières traces du Choucas (2006)
 Previews (1994)
 Puzzle (1975)
 Qui est là? (1990)
 Reflets LR (2003–06), videomusic
 Ricercare (1998)
 Signé Dionysos (1986–91)
 Simulacres: un autoportrait (1991)
 Sol y sombra L'espace des spectres (1998, 2000), guitar, and tape
 Sous le regard d'un soleil noir (1979–81)
 Studio de nuit (1992)
 Syntagmes (1975)
 Terre d'ombres (2006), videomusic
 Les traces du rêve (1986), film soundtrack, Les traces du rêve by Jean-Daniel Lafond, NFB
 Transits élémentaires (1983)
 Un autre Printemps (2000)
 Un autre Printemps [vidéo] (2000)
 Vol d'Arondes (1999, 2002)
 Voyage dans le voyage (1991), radiophonic piece
 Voyage-miroir (2004)
 Zones et rhizomes (1978)

References

Further reading

Dhomont, Francis. "L'écriture acousmatique: Rappels et questionnements". eContact! 12.4 — Perspectives on the Electroacoustic Work / Perspectives sur l'œuvre électroacoustique (August 2010). Montréal: CEC.
_. 2008. "Abstraction et figuration dans ma musique / Abstraktion und Gegenständlichkeit in meiner Musik" (French/German). Komposition und Musikwissenschaft im Dialog VI, edited by Marcus Erbe and Christoph von Blumröder. Vienna: Verlag Der Apfel, 2008. pp. 134–167. Available online in eContact! 11.2 — Figures canadiennes (2) / Canadian Figures (2) (July 2009). Montréal: CEC.
_. "Abstraction et figuration dans ma musique." eContact! 11.2 — Figures canadiennes (2) / Canadian Figures (2) (July 2009). Montréal: CEC.
_. "Éléments pour une syntaxe". eContact! 11.2 — Figures canadiennes (2) / Canadian Figures (2) (July 2009). Montréal: CEC.
Gayou, Évelyne (Ed.). 2006. Francis Dhomont. Paris: INA, 2006. 
Mountain, Rosemary. "From Wire to Computer. Francis Dhomont at 80." Computer Music Journal 30/3 (Fall 2006), pp. 10–21.
Paes, Rui Eduardo. "Entretien avec Francis Dhomont". eContact! 11.2 — Figures canadiennes (2) / Canadian Figures (2) (July 2009). Montréal: CEC.
Paland, Ralph. 2008. "Dhomont, Francis." Die Musik in Geschichte und Gegenwart. 2nd edition. Supplementary volume, edited by Ludwig Finscher. Kassel, Stuttgart: Bärenreiter, Metzler. . 
 _. "In akusmatischer Nacht: Elektroakustische Proust-Bilder franko-kanadischer Komponisten im poetologischen Kontext der Musique acousmatique." Marcel Proust und die Musik: Beiträge des Symposions der Marcel Proust Gesellschaft in Wien im November 2009. edited by Albert Gier. Berlin: Insel Verlag, 2012. pp. 233–284. 
_. "Mythen der elektroakustischen 'Revolution': Aktuelle Geschichtskonstruktionen einer Musik ohne Vergangenheit." Vorzeitbelebung: Vergangenheits- und Gegenwarts-Reflexionen in der Musik heute, edited by Jörn Peter Hiekel. Hofheim: Wolke Verlag, 2010. pp. 107–139. 
Steenhuisen, Paul. "Interview with Francis Dhomont." Sonic Mosaics: Conversations with Composers. Edmonton: University of Alberta Press, 2009.

External links
"Francis Dhomont", The Canadian Encyclopedia
 "Francis Dhomont", electrocd.com

1926 births
Living people
20th-century classical composers
21st-century classical composers
French classical composers
French male classical composers
Electroacoustic music composers
Musicians from Paris
20th-century French composers
21st-century French composers
20th-century French male musicians
21st-century French male musicians